Ray Jarvis may refer to:

 Ray Jarvis (American football) (born 1949), American football wide receiver in the NFL
 Ray Jarvis (baseball) (born 1946), Major League Baseball pitcher